The 2010 IAAF Hammer Throw Challenge was the inaugural edition of the IAAF Hammer Throw Challenge, an international series of hammer throw competitions around the world.

Koji Murofushi of Japan won the men's challenge, while Betty Heidler of Germany prevailed on women's side.

Origin

2010 marked the first edition of the IAAF Diamond League, which replaced the IAAF Golden League as the highest level of international track and field meetings. The Diamond League sought to showcase all the events, but according to IAAF, hammer throw could not be included for infrastructure reasons. Therefore, a separate Hammer Throw Challenge was created.

Awards

On February 19, IAAF announced a US$202,000 prize fund for the Challenge, to be split equally between men and women. The overall winners would pocket $30,000 each. In addition, each of the fourteen competitions would award $7,500 in prize money, with $2,000 going to the winner.

Format and calendar

The 2010 IAAF Hammer Throw Challenge consisted of a total of 14 competitions (seven for men and seven for women), in a total of 11 meets (three meets would feature both men and women). Points were scored simply by adding together an athlete's three best results from the Challenge (no more than one per meet). An athlete could compete in as many meets as they liked, but only the three best results would count. Any athlete achieving a new (and ratified) world record would receive a 1-meter bonus.

Results

Men

35-year-old Koji Murofushi of Japan, Olympic gold medalist from 2004, managed to beat Tajikistan's Dilshod Nazarov by two and a half meters despite only competing three times. Libor Charfreitag, who won the European championship in 2010, placed third.

Women

2007 World champion Betty Heidler edged out reigning champion and world record holder Anita Włodarczyk in a close race. 2006 European champion Tatyana Lysenko placed third.

References

IAAF Hammer Throw Challenge
Hammer Throw Challenge